Bom Princípio is a municipality in the state of Rio Grande do Sul, Brazil. It is known in alla Brazil as Strawberry Land.

It was raised to municipality status in 1992, the area being taken out of the municipalities of São Sebastião do Caí and Montenegro. Part of its initial area subsequently formed the municipalities of Tupandi and São Vendelino.

See also
List of municipalities in Rio Grande do Sul

References

Municipalities in Rio Grande do Sul